Kraličky (former name Sajlerov was used to 1950; German name: Seilerndorf) is a little village in the Czech Republic. It is administrative part of Kralice na Hané and lies in Okres Prostějov. Kraličky lies on the railway between Nezamylice and Olomouc.

Kraličky was established in 1791 on the field possessed by duke of Seilern family. Seilerns owned Kralice manor.

There is the Chapel of Saint John of Nepomuk, which was built up in 1881.

External links 
 

Villages in Prostějov District
Populated places established in 1791
1791 establishments in Europe